Manuel Belleri (born 29 August 1977) is an Italian footballer who played as a defender. Since 2016 he is a technical director of A.C. Milan Academy Tokyo and resides in Tokyo, Japan.

Football career
Belleri started his career at Lumezzane. He played in Serie A for Empoli in the 2002–03 season. When Empoli failed to protect his place in 2004, Belleri, Di Natale and Cribari were sold to Udinese in a co-ownership deal, with Almirón and Nomvethe moving in the opposite direction. Cribari and Belleri were sold to S.S. Lazio the next year. Belleri signed a 4-year contract in another co-ownership deal for €250,000 transfer fee. In June 2006, Belleri, Cribari, Pandev and Mauri were acquired outright from Udinese for €400,000, €3 million, €4 million and €3 million respectively.

In the mid-2007, Belleri was loaned to Atalanta B.C. After the game against A.C. Milan on 25 January 2009, Bologna F.C. 1909 announced the signing of Belleri on loan.

He joined Lecce on 31 August 2009 on a free transfer.

Post-playing career
Belleri obtained the license as a youth team coach in 2013. In the same year Belleri was admitted to the course that teach sport directorship.

In 2015 he was hired by A.C. Milan as one of the 16 trainers of A.C. Milan Academy. He was assigned a role that he would be sent to one of the 16 academies that located abroad (13 countries).

In 2016 he moved to Tokyo, Japan as a technical director of A.C. Milan Academy Tokyo.

References

External links 
 

Italian footballers
Empoli F.C. players
Udinese Calcio players
S.S. Lazio players
Atalanta B.C. players
Bologna F.C. 1909 players
U.S. Lecce players
Serie A players
Serie B players
Serie C players
Association football fullbacks
Footballers from Brescia
1977 births
Living people
F.C. Lumezzane V.G.Z. A.S.D. players